Kolu Kepo (born July 15, 1993) is a footballer from Papua New Guinea. He plays for Kalo F.C. and the Papua New Guinea national football team.

Hekari Central Cup

Even though he was disconsolate over losing the 2016 Hekari Central Cup final to Papaka, Kepo lifted the 2017 Hekari Central Cup trophy with his three brothers, earning the tournament's Most Valuable Player award as well.

He played for Wantoks FC.

He played for Hekari United F.C.

He is a Papua New Guinea International.

International career

International goals
Scores and results list Papua New Guinea's goal tally first.

References

External links 
 at National-Football-Teams

Papua New Guinea international footballers
Papua New Guinean footballers
Living people
Year of birth missing (living people)
Association footballers not categorized by position